Edward LeSaint (January 1, 1871 – September 10, 1940) was an American stage and film actor and director whose career began in the silent era. He acted in over 300 films and directed more than 90. He was sometimes credited as Edward J. Le Saint.

Early years
LeSaint was born in Cincinnati, Ohio, of French ancestry. His schooling also was in Cincinnati. Before venturing into entertainment, he worked in a railroad's auditing office.

Career

LeSaint acted with a stock theater company in Cincinnati for a couple of years, then spent 15 years acting "in most of the prominent road shows all over the states." On Broadway, LeSaint appeared (billed as Edward J. Le Saint) in Robert Emmet (1904), The Big Fight (1928), and Houseparty (1929).

He went on to work with the Kinemacolor company and Selig Polyscope Company in film production before he joined Universal Pictures. He had a bit part as a judge in Too Many Women (1934).

LeSaint directed approximately 50 films from 1912 to 1916.

Personal life and death
He married Stella Razetto on December 25, 1913, and remained with her until his death. He died on September 10, 1940, in Hollywood, aged 69. He was buried in Hollywood Forever Cemetery.

Selected filmography

As actor

Spellbound (1916) - Katti Hab
Mary of the Movies (1923) - Himself (uncredited)
 The Talk of Hollywood (1929) - Edward Hamilton
Shadow of the Law (1930) - Judge (uncredited)
For the Defense (1930) - Judge at First Trial (uncredited)
Manslaughter (1930) - Curtis (uncredited)
The Costello Case (1930)
The Dawn Trail (1930) - Amos
Mothers Cry (1930) - Warden (uncredited)
 The Last Parade (1931) - Chief of Police (uncredited)
Millie (1931) - Judge (uncredited)
Gentleman's Fate (1931) - Detective Meyers (uncredited)
City Streets (1931) - Shooting Gallery Patron (uncredited)
Sky Raiders (1931) - Bradford
Kick In (1931) - Purnell, Chick's Boss
A Free Soul (1931) - Judge (uncredited)
The Lawyer's Secret (1931) - Prison Warden (uncredited)
The Miracle Woman (1931) - Parishioner (uncredited)
Huckleberry Finn (1931) - Doc Robinson (uncredited)
Caught (1931) - Haverstraw
Graft (1931) - Newspaper Printer (uncredited)
The Beloved Bachelor (1931) - Mayor of San Francisco (uncredited)
Girls About Town (1931) - Party Guest (uncredited)
The Fighting Marshal (1931) - Warden Decker
Range Feud (1931) - John Walton
The Deadline (1931) - Henry Evans
Under Eighteen (1931) - Minister at Wedding (uncredited)
Delicious (1931) - Judge (uncredited)
Emma (1932) - Druggist at Trial (uncredited)
Forbidden (1932) - Grover's Doctor (uncredited)
One Man Law (1932) - Judge Cooper (uncredited)
Tomorrow and Tomorrow (1932) - Professor Flynn (uncredited)
Polly of the Circus (1932) - Dr. Brownell (uncredited)
South of the Rio Grande (1932) - Mayor (uncredited)
The Wet Parade (1932) - Southerner (uncredited)
High Speed (1932) - Police Captain Blaine
Destry Rides Again (1932) - Mr. Dangerfield
Letty Lynton (1932) - Dr. Sanders (uncredited)
Strangers of the Evening (1932) - Policeman (uncredited)
Radio Patrol (1932) - Police Academy Commander (uncredited)
Street of Women (1932) - Minister at Wedding (uncredited)
Daring Danger (1932) - First Ranch Owner
The Texas Bad Man (1932) - Chester Bigelow - Banker
The Washington Masquerade (1932) - Senator Haley (uncredited)
Drifting Souls (1932) - Doctor
Horse Feathers (1932) - Professor in Wagstaff's Study (uncredited)
 The Last Man (1932) - Captain of the Glencoe
Two Against the World (1932) - Judge (uncredited)
Thirteen Women (1932) - Chief of Detectives (uncredited)
The Night of June 13 (1932) - Mr. Henry Morrow (uncredited)
The Phantom President (1932) - Convention Chairman (uncredited)
Breach of Promise (1932) - Judge
Virtue (1932) - Judge (uncredited)
Hidden Gold (1932) - The Chief (uncredited)
I Am a Fugitive from a Chain Gang (1932) - Chamber of Commerce Chairman (uncredited)
Speed Demon (1932) - Judge
Prosperity (1932) - Train Conductor (uncredited)
If I Had a Million (1932) - Mr. Brown (uncredited)
Tess of the Storm Country (1932) - Judge (uncredited)
No More Orchids (1932) - Captain Jeffries (uncredited)
The Sign of the Cross (1932) - Enthusiastic Spectator (uncredited)
Central Park (1932) - Police Commissioner (uncredited)
Child of Manhattan (1933) - Dr. Schultz
Treason (1933) - Judge Randall
Smoke Lightning (1933) - Judge Cooper (uncredited)
King of the Jungle (1933) - Policeman (uncredited)
Gabriel Over the White House (1933) - Chief Justice of the United States (uncredited)
The Cohens and Kellys in Trouble (1933) - Freighter Captain (uncredited)
The Working Man (1933) - Reeves Company Board Member (uncredited)
The Thrill Hunter (1933) - Ed Jackson
 Unknown Valley (1933) - Jim Bridger (uncredited)
Man Hunt (1933) - Henry Woodward aka Barrows
Tomorrow at Seven (1933) - Coroner
Jennie Gerhardt (1933) - Lester's Doctor (uncredited)
The Silk Express (1933) - Mill Owner in Association (uncredited)
The Man Who Dared (1933) - Miami Yachtsman (uncredited)
I Love That Man (1933) - Prison Warden (uncredited)
The Wrecker (1933) - Doctor
Baby Face (1933) - Bank Director (uncredited)
The Power and the Glory (1933) - Doctor (uncredited)
Deluge (1933) - Townsman (uncredited)
The Last Trail (1933) - Judge Wilson
Lady for a Day (1933) - Police Capt. Moore (uncredited)
Torch Singer (1933) - Doctor (uncredited)
Brief Moment (1933) - Higgins - Office Manager
Broken Dreams (1933) - Judge Harvey E. Blake
Hold the Press (1933) - Judge O'Neill
Duck Soup (1933) - Secretary of Labor (uncredited)
The Right to Romance (1933) - Doctor at Hospital (uncredited)
Before Midnight (1933) - Harry Graham (uncredited)
The Big Shakedown (1934) - Fillmore - Board Member (uncredited)
Frontier Marshal (1934) - Judge Walters
This Side of Heaven (1934) - Rev. J.A. Hayes (uncredited)
 The Quitter (1934) - Travers
Gambling Lady (1934) - Sheila's Attorney (uncredited)
The House of Rothschild (1934) - Master of Ceremonies (uncredited)
George White's Scandals (1934) - Judge O'Neill
The Lost Jungle (1934) - Capt. Robinson
School for Girls (1934) - Judge
Once to Every Woman (1934) - Priest
You're Telling Me! (1934) - Conductor (uncredited)
Upper World (1934) - Henshaw (scenes deleted)
Sadie McKee (1934) - Brennan's Second Doctor (uncredited)
Hell Bent for Love (1934) - Judge
Girl in Danger (1934) - Judge (uncredited)
Green Eyes (1934) - Banker (uncredited)
A Man's Game (1934) - Judge
Madame Du Barry (1934) - Doctor (uncredited)
She Learned About Sailors (1934) - Justice of the Peace (uncredited)
The Old Fashioned Way (1934) - Train Conductor (uncredited)
Chained (1934) - S.S. Official (uncredited)
Take the Stand (1934) - Judge (uncredited)
Girl in Danger (1934) - Chief of Police O'Brien
The Lemon Drop Kid (1934) - Doctor
A Lost Lady (1934) - Mr. Cannon (uncredited)
The Curtain Falls (1934) - Minor Role (uncredited)
Student Tour (1934) - Old Graduate (uncredited)
Tomorrow's Youth (1934) - Judge
I'll Fix It (1934) - Chairman (uncredited)
The President Vanishes (1934) - Cabinet Member (uncredited)
Jealousy (1934) - Hospital Doctor (uncredited)
Flirting with Danger (1934) - American Consul in San Rico (uncredited)
The Westerner (1934) - Zach Addison
Fugitive Lady (1934) - Judge (uncredited)
The Gay Bride (1934) - Justice of the Peace (uncredited)
Sons of Steel (1934) - Mr. Herman
The Band Plays On (1934) - Doctor (uncredited)
White Lies (1934) - Judge (uncredited)
Unknown Woman (1935)
Fighting Shadows (1935)
Justice of the Range (1935)
Riding Wild (1935)
Tomorrow's Youth (1935)
In Spite of Danger (1935)
On Probation (1935)
End of the Trail (1936)
Half Shot Shooters (1936) - Major Smith
Disorder in the Court (1936) - Judge (uncredited)
Reefer Madness (1936) - Judge (uncredited)
The Oregon Trail (1936)
Counterfeit Lady (1936)
Code of the Range (1936)
The Drag-Net (1936)
Modern Times (1936) - Sheriff Couler
Killer at Large (1936)
Shakedown (1936)
Racketeers in Exile (1937)
Two Gun Law (1937)
Outlaws of the Prairie (1937)
The Adventures of Tom Sawyer (1938) - Coroner on Trial (uncredited)
The Gladiator (1938)
West of Cheyenne (1938)
The Main Event (1938)
Call of the Rockies (1938)
Law of the Plains (1938)
Squadron of Honor (1938)
The Colorado Trail (1938)
Lincoln in the White House (1939)
Jesse James (1939)
The Stranger from Texas (1939)
Arizona Legion (1939)
Fugitive at Large (1939)
The Thundering West (1939)

As director

Jim's Atonement (1912)
His Father's Rifle (1914)
Lord John's Journal (1915)
Lord John in New York (1915)
The Grey Sisterhood (1916)
Three Fingered Jenny (1916)
The League of the Future (1916)
The Soul of Kura San (1916)
The Three Godfathers (1916)
The Jackals of a Great City (1916)
Cupid's Round Up (1916)
 Fighting Mad (1917)
 The Wolf and His Mate (1918)
 Painted Lips (1918)
 Nobody's Wife (1918)
The Feud (1919)
The Mother of His Children (1920)
 The Girl of My Heart (1920)
Two Moons (1920)
The Sleepwalker (1922)
Only a Shop Girl (1922)
More to Be Pitied Than Scorned (1923)
 Yesterday's Wife (1923)
 Temptation (1923)
 The Marriage Market (1923)
Discontented Husbands (1924)
 Three Keys (1925)
 The Love Gamble (1925)
 Speed (1925)
The Unwritten Law (1925)
Brooding Eyes (1926)
 The Millionaire Policeman (1926)

References

External links

1871 births
1940 deaths
American male film actors
American male silent film actors
Male actors from Cincinnati
Male actors from Philadelphia
Male actors from Los Angeles
Film directors from California
Film directors from Ohio
20th-century American male actors
Male Western (genre) film actors
American male stage actors
Broadway theatre people